T-Centralen (Swedish for "The T-Central"; T being an abbreviation for "tunnelbana", the Swedish word for "underground"  or "subway") is a metro station that forms the heart of the Stockholm metro system, in the sense that it is the only station where all three of the system's lines meet. That, its central location, and its connections with other modes of transport make it the busiest station in the system. The station is located in the Norrmalm borough of Stockholm, between Sergels torg (Sergel's Square) and the street of Vasagatan.

On a winter day in 2018, some 340,000 passengers (174,550 boarding and 166,850 alighting) travelled to or from the metro station. It is connected by a pedestrian underpass to the neighbouring Stockholm Central Station across Vasagatan (for national and regional trains) and to the Cityterminalen long-distance bus terminal, making it easy to continue a journey started by metro train.

When opened on 24 November 1957 the name of the station was "Centralen" ("The Central"), but it was renamed on 27 January 1958, as the metro station often was mistaken for the central railway station to which it is connected, but with some distance. During construction, it was intended to be called Klara, but that name was abandoned before opening. T-Centralen has two separate sets of platforms, connected by a long moving walkway on a mezzanine level. The station was open as part of the section connecting Slussen and Hötorget thereby west and east sections of the green line. On 5 April 1964, T-Centralen became the north terminus of the first stretch of the Red line running to Fruängen. On 16 May 1965, the Red line was extended north to Östermalmstorg. On 31 August 1975, the first stretch of the Blue Line to Hjulsta was opened. The trains were running via Hallonbergen and Rinkeby. On 30 October 1977, a one-station extension of the Blue line east to Kungsträdgården was opened.

The Stockholm City commuter rail station is located below the metro station, with direct escalators to the metro platforms. It opened on 10 July 2017 as part of the Stockholm City Line. Since 2018, T-Centralen has been the western terminus of the Spårväg City tramway.

First station: Lines 17–19 (Green Line) and 13–14 (Red Line)

This station, located 1.5 km part of T-Centralen are lines 17–19 (Green line) from Gamla stan and Hötorget, and lines 13–14 (Red line) between Gamla stan and Östermalmstorg. The station is located under Klara Church and Åhléns City department store.

The station has two platforms located at different ground levels. The upper level is located 8,5 metres below ground, and serves the northbound Green line and southbound Red line. The lower level is 14 metres below ground, and serves the southbound Green line and northbound Red line, allowing cross-platform interchange between opposite-direction trains between these two lines; Gamla stan  and Slussen, the next two stations to the south, are similarly arranged to allow easy transfers between trains going in the same direction.

The station has two entrances. One (TCE S) is located south-west, and has doors at Vasagatan 20, Klara Västra Kyrkogata 20 and an entrance located in Stockholm Central by a pedestrian underpass which was opened on 1 December 1958. The second entrance (TCE N) is located to the northeast, and its doors are located at Drottninggatan, Sergels torg 16 and Klarabergsgatan 48. Due to the number of drug addicts in the surrounding area, the entrance to Klara kyrka and the walkway were closed for a long time, with a massive steel plate blocking the doors. The entrance reopened in 2013.

Second station: Lines 10 and 11 (Blue Line)

The second part of T-Centralen, located 700 meters from the Blue-line terminus of Kungsträdgården, opened on 31 August 1975 as the 79th station.  Lines 10–11 (which make up the Blue line) pass through this station from metro stations Kungsträdgården to the east and Rådhuset to the west. The station lies under the Åhléns department store and Centralposten post office.

The station is located 26–32 metres below ground, and has one platform.

This station has two entrances. The first one (TCE X) has its doors at Vasagatan 9 (about 150 metres north of the Central Station, along Vasagatan Street) and, across the street, Vasagatan 36. The second one (TCE N, shared with the first station, above) has its doors at Sergels torg and Klarabergsgatan. Access to the Blue line platform via the latter entrance is by two escalators.

Gallery

References

External links
Plan of station (pdf)
Images of T-Centralen

Buildings and structures in Stockholm
Metropolitan Stockholm
Green line (Stockholm metro) stations
Red line (Stockholm metro) stations
Blue line (Stockholm metro) stations
Railway stations opened in 1957
1957 establishments in Sweden